Chief of Staff may refer to the following positions in Canada:

Military
 Since 1964:
 Chief of the Defence Staff (Canada), the senior officer of the combined Canadian armed forces
 In the Armed Forces Council, various subordinate positions such as "Chief of Staff (Materiel)" 
 Before 1964:
 Chief of the General Staff (army) from 1904  
 Chief of the Naval Staff from 1928
 Chief of the Air Staff from 1938
 Chiefs of Staff Committee (Canada), from 1951 the above three plus a chairman

Other
 Chief of Staff to the Prime Minister (Canada), since 1987 the top official of the Prime Minister's Office